Wulu County is an administrative area (county) located in Lakes State, South Sudan. In August 2016, the former larger Wulu County had split to create a newer smaller Wulu County and Barghel County.

References

Counties of South Sudan